Jaroslav Pešán (28 January 1912 Klášter Hradiště nad Jizerou – 11 August 1972 Brno) was a Czechoslovakian soldier, paratrooper, World War II veteran, and a member of the Resistance in the Protectorate of Bohemia and Moravia.

Jaroslav fought at the Battle of France. Later, he operated as a member of Platinum-Pewter, a military-intelligence parachute platoon, across the Nazi-occupied Protectorate of Bohemia and Moravia, today's Czech Republic.

One of his platoon colleagues was Jaroslav Klemes, one of the longest-living and best-known Czechoslovakian World War II veterans.

Youth 
Jaroslav was born on January 28, 1912, in Klášter Hradiště nad Jizerou. His father Emil was a shoemaker and farmer by occupation. His mother Gabriela, born as Macharovská, was a homemaker. Jaroslav had seven siblings.

Jaroslav attended a vocational brewer training. Subsequently, he worked as a brewer up until the beginning of his military service in 1933. Although he started military service in Mladá Boleslav, he reallocated to Prague's infantry regiment after completing basic training. As Jaroslav finished the military service, he returned to his brewing occupation. In 1938 Jaroslav shifted to a sommelier position.

In Exile 
In October 1939, Jaroslav headed to France. However, to be able to do so, Jaroslav had to walk across Slovakia, Hungary, the rest of the Balkans, Turkey, and Syria. From Syria, he sailed to France. When finally in France, Jaroslav reported to the foreign section of the Czechoslovakian Army. On January 4, 1940, in Agde, he was assigned to the 1. infantry regiment of the Czechoslovakian Army. While Jaroslav was part of this regiment, he fought in the Battle of France.

After the fall of France, Jaroslav evacuated to the United Kingdom. In the UK, Jaroslav joined the 1. infantry battalion. On December 1, 1940, he passed driving tests and was promoted to Gefreiter, a second rank. Between February 21 and March 27, 1942, Jaroslav passed sabotage and parachuting courses. From October 26 to July 1942, Jaroslav completed courses focused on industrial sabotage, receipt of aircraft, civilian employment, conspiracy, and further aspects of parachuting. During this period, Jaroslav was promoted to a corporal rank and became a member of the platoon Pewter and later the Platinum-Pewter. In August 1944, Jaroslav moved to a station in Bari, Italy, where he was waiting for further orders.

Deployment 
Jaroslav was deployed as a paratrooper in the area of Nasavrky on February 17, 1945. Along with his partners from Platinum-Pewter, Jaroslav begun executing orders related to military intelligence and also the organization and receipts of secret air shipments. He executed most of these actions in the area of the Bohemian-Moravian Highlands.

After WWII 
On May 8, 1945, Jaroslav was promoted to a second lieutenant. During the same year, he married and had two children. Continuously, Jaroslav worked his way up to the rank of senior lieutenant of infantry. During this period, Jaroslav worked across various military positions, including the commander of the 71st parachute battalion's paratrooper school or at the Grande Prague's headquarters. On October 23, 1948, Jaroslav was promoted to the captain of infantry. He served as the chief of a military garrison at Mimoň. Soon, he was promoted to the staff captain rank.

The Communist Party of Czechoslovakia seized power during 1948. For political purposes, numerous World War II veterans were dismissed from the military service. Jaroslav was dismissed on August 31, 1951. He was not given any justification for the dismissal. Contrariwise, the party banned Jaroslav from obtaining any employment other than in the heavy industry, mining, or agriculture. Additionally, Jaroslav and his family, including his two young children, were given 24 hours to abandon their home. The government took their property without offering any compensation. Later on, Jaroslav was able to obtain employment as a construction worker and then as a driver. After eight years, in 1959, Jaroslav was permitted to start working within the Veterinary Research Institute in Brno. Jaroslav died on August 11, 1972.

In 1992, the Czech government recognized Jaroslav's contribution to anti-Nazi resistance. In memoriam, Jaroslav was promoted to the rank of lieutenant colonel of infantry and received several awards and recognitions. In 1995, he was also given a memorial plate publicly displayed in a proximity of the brewery in Hradiště nad Jizero.

His son is Jaroslav Pešán,a veterinary and politician. The son was a member of the Parliament's lower house, the Chamber of Deputies of the Czech Republic. He represented the ODS.

Honors 

 1944 –  Commemorative Medal of Czechoslovak Army Abroad for fighting for the French and British armies
 1945 –  Czechoslovak Was Cross 1939-1945 for great service while in exile
 1945 –   The Czechoslovak Military Medal "For the Merit" 1st Class for actions done outside of the battlefield
 1945 –  Czechoslovak Medal for Bravery before the Enemy  
 1950 – Decoration of Czechoslovak Partisan for guerilla activities performed against the Nazi regime

References

Literature 

 Reichl, Martin. 
 Reichl, Martin & Čvančara, Jaroslav. (2020). Cesty osudu : [životní příběhy československých parašutistů vycvičených v létech 1941-45 ve Velké Británii] /.

External links 

 Paratroopers List
 Chamber of Deputies, Czech Republic

1972 deaths
1912 births
Czech resistance members